A straight-14 engine or inline-14 engine is a fourteen-cylinder piston engine with all fourteen cylinders mounted in a straight line along the crankcase. This design results in a very long engine, therefore it has only been used as marine propulsion engines in large ships.

The only straight-14 engine known to reach production is part of the Wärtsilä-Sulzer RTA96-C family of 6-cylinder to 14-cylinder two-stroke marine engines. This engine is used in the Emma Mærsk, which was the world's largest container ship when it was built in 2006.

References

Straight-14
14-cylinder engines
14